Gouveia is a village located in Sintra Municipality, next to the town of Fontanelas, Portugal. Gouveia is known as the aldeia em verso (village in verse), because its signs containing the names of the streets always carry a stanza.

Places in Sintra
Villages in Portugal